Lewis Paul Ingham Hornby (born 25 April 1995) is an English footballer who plays as a midfielder.

Career
Hornby started a two-year scholarship with Northampton Town in the summer of 2011. In December 2011, he was awarded his first squad number by manager Aidy Boothroyd. In February 2012, he joined Football Conference side Kettering Town on loan. Hornby then put pen to paper on a new -year deal leading him through to 2015. He made his professional debut on 9 October 2012, in a 2–1 win over Colchester United in the Football League Trophy, coming on as a substitute for Kemar Roofe. Hornby then went on to play in the play off final against Bradford City in which they lost 3–0.

After spending the whole of the 2013–14 season injured and returning from injury late in 2014–15 he was released at the end of the season when his contract expired.

During summer 2015, Hornby spent time on trial with Sheffield Wednesday.

Ahead of the 2016–17 season, Hornby rejoined Kettering Town on a permanent deal.

Personal life
He is the older brother of Reims forward Fraser Hornby. Hornby is of Scottish descent.

References

External links

Stats at Aylesbury United

1995 births
Living people
Footballers from Northampton
English footballers
English people of Scottish descent
Association football midfielders
Northampton Town F.C. players
Kettering Town F.C. players
English Football League players
National League (English football) players